Lucien Southard (1827, Sharon, Vermont – 1881, Augusta, Georgia) was an American conductor, who directed concerts at the Peabody Institute following the tenure of James Monroe Deems.  Southard's reign in control of the Institute was not entirely positive, a situation which Southard blamed on the lack of a "proper musical atmosphere" in Baltimore, Maryland.  Southard became the first director of the Baltimore Academy of Music.  He also published Elements of Thorough Bass and Harmony, in 1865.

References
Peabody Institute
 Songs by Lucien Southard

1827 births
1881 deaths
American conductors (music)
American male conductors (music)
19th-century conductors (music)
19th-century American musicians